The 1977–78 Anglo-Scottish Cup was the third edition of the tournament. It was won by Bristol City, who beat St Mirren in a two-legged final by 3–2 on aggregate.

English Group

Group A

Group B

Group C

Group D

Scottish Group

1st Round 1st Leg 
{|
|-
|valign="top"|
|}

1st Round 2nd Leg 
{|
|-
|valign="top"|
|}

Quarter-finals 1st Leg

Quarter-finals 2nd Leg

Semi-finals 1st Leg

Semi-finals 2nd Leg

Final 1st Leg

Final 2nd Leg

Notes and references

1977–78 in English football
1977–78 in Scottish football
England–Scotland relations